Louise St John Kennedy (born 1950) has been an Australian architect based in Perth, Western Australia, and has practiced across Australia and America. Louise has a degree in Psychology from the University of Western Australia (1970), and a Bachelor of Architecture from the University of Melbourne (1978). She continues to practice in Claremont, Western Australia, now as a Building Designer, Interior Designer and Landscape Designer.

Student years and early practice 
As a student at Melbourne University she worked for a period for Graeme Gunn, and after graduating worked for a period with John Taylor Architect and Builder in South Yarra. Whilst a student she completed a two home renovations for herself, but her first commissioned project came from the Age cartoonist John Spooner to refit his office in Malvern.

After moving back to Perth to work with Robert Cann, St John Kennedy commenced practice in 1981 with the construction of her own house in Rupert Street, Subiaco. Upon completion this house was awarded a commendation in the WA RAIA awards, the first female to receive this honour. It was followed shortly after by the Limestone Residence, Hynes Rd Dalkeith and the Mouat St Gallery Workshops and Residence, Fremantle. Both received RAIA awards.

Career 
After receiving the Robin Boyd award from the Royal Australian Institute of Architects in 1984, St John Kennedy completed a large body of work, mainly residential, hospitality and retail, across Western Australia. She has been the architect for Giorgio Armani retail projects throughout Australia.

Her academic involvement includes lecturing on Women in Architecture at UWA School of Architecture, the first course on Women in Architecture in Australia. She jointly founded Women in Architecure in Western Australia. She reviewed the Civil and Criminal justice system in WA for the Law Reform Commission and was a founder internationally of the investigation of architectural psychology in law and courts.
St John Kennedy also founded Hay River wines in Mount Barker, one of the first vineyards in south west Western Australia.

Awards and achievements 
In 1984, St John Kennedy won the Robin Boyd award for Residential architecture for the Downes-Stoney residence in East Perth. She was the first female recipient of the award and the first Western Australian recipient of the award. She has won numerous other awards, including the Bunnings Timber award 1988, the Fremantle Award 1983, and her work has been widely published.

Louise St John Kennedy was a founding member of the Australian Architecture Association. She was the first woman appointed to both the Architects Board of Western Australia, and the Chapter Council of the RAIA WA. She was appointed to the Architect's Board of Western Australia Acreditation Comittee to review Schools of Architecture at Universities in Western Australia. She was an examiner for the Architect's Board of Western Australia. She was a founding board member of the Perth Institute of Contemporary Art, and served on the board at LandCorp, the Western Australian Land Authority, as well as initiating their Design and Sustainability department.

Notable projects 
 The Mosman Bay Tea Rooms, Mosman Park
 Eric and Rinske Carr Gallery Residence and Workshops. Mouat St. Fremantle.
 The Dempster House, Mosman Park 
 The Eastwood House, Mandurah
 The Pines Business Centre, Cottesloe
 Chester Road Housing Development, Claremont
 San Lorenzo Restaurant, Claremont

Gallery

References 

Living people
1950 births
Architects from Western Australia
Australian women architects
20th-century Australian architects
21st-century Australian architects
University of Melbourne alumni
University of Western Australia alumni
University of Melbourne women
20th-century Australian women
21st-century Australian women